Mount Bonneville is located in the Wind River Range in the U.S. state of Wyoming. The summit is located in the Bridger Wilderness of Bridger-Teton National Forest, immediately west of the Continental Divide. Mount Bonneville is a distinctively iconic peak of the Wind River Range, and was named after explorer Benjamin Bonneville.

Hazards

Encountering bears is a concern in the Wind River Range. There are other concerns as well, including bugs, wildfires, adverse snow conditions and nighttime cold temperatures.

Importantly, there have been notable incidents, including accidental deaths, due to falls from steep cliffs (a misstep could be fatal in this class 4/5 terrain) and due to falling rocks, over the years, including 1993, 2007 (involving an experienced NOLS leader), 2015 and 2018. Other incidents include a seriously injured backpacker being airlifted near SquareTop Mountain in 2005, and a fatal hiker incident (from an apparent accidental fall) in 2006 that involved state search and rescue. The U.S. Forest Service does not offer updated aggregated records on the official number of fatalities in the Wind River Range.

References

External links
 General Information on the Wind River Range
 Climbing the Wind River Range (more)
 Glaciers in the Wind River Range
 Shoshone National Forest Federal website
 Continental Divide Trail information

Bridger–Teton National Forest
Greater Yellowstone Ecosystem
Green River (Colorado River tributary)
Landforms of Fremont County, Wyoming
Mountain ranges of Wyoming
Mountains of Fremont County, Wyoming
Mountains of Wyoming
Ranges of the Rocky Mountains
Shoshone National Forest